Min Letya (died 1586) was governor of Ava (Inwa) from 1584 to 1586 during the reign of King Nanda of Toungoo Dynasty of Burma (Myanmar). Min Letya was the only son of King Tabinshwehti mentioned in the Burmese chronicles.

Letya was appointed governor of Ava (Inwa) in May 1584 by Nanda. His appointment came after the king had put down a serious rebellion by Thado Minsaw, the viceroy of Ava on 24 April 1584 and after the king had been informed of a rebellion by Siam in May 1584. The office was strictly a non-hereditary governorship, not the viceroyship Thado Minsaw enjoyed. It reflected Nanda's desire not to have a strong ruler in Upper Burma to be in a position to challenge him while he dealt with Siam. Letya loyally administered Upper Burma without incident until he died in October 1586. He was succeeded by Minye Kyawswa II, a son of Nanda, as viceroy.

Letya had at least one daughter named Khin Me, who later became a minor queen of King Nyaungyan.

Notes

References

Bibliography
 

First Toungoo Empire
1586 deaths
Year of birth missing